Firouzeh Mizani (born December 12, 1950, in Tehran, Iran) is a contemporary Persian poet, writer, and journalist.

Mizani's poems first appeared in Tamasha Magazine and a literary monthly, Roudaki, in 1975. As a result of Manouchehr Atashi's literary analysis of her work, she has often been linked to the movement of "Pure Poetry" of South of Iran. "Pure Poetry" is a unique genre in the progression of Iran's modern "New Poetry".

Firouzeh Mizani has published five books of poems. "Poetry of the Moment" is the title of three consecutive volumes of poetry from over forty modern Iranian poets. She, along with Ahmad Mohit, accumulated poems from well known as well as emerging poets from different parts of Iran.

Books 
 Wandering Freshness (1979)
 Poetry of the Moment, Volume 1 (1988)
 Poetry of the Moment, Volume 2 (1990)
 Poetry of the Moment, Volume 3 (1996)
 Envious of the Stone (1994)

References

External links
http://www.tasiyan.ir/view.php?kindex=107
https://web.archive.org/web/20120413195238/http://www.qoqnoos.ir/ShowNaqd.asp?ID=965

20th-century Iranian poets
21st-century Iranian poets
1950 births
Living people